Elaine Douvas (born 1952) has been Principal Oboe of the Metropolitan Opera Orchestra in New York City since 1977. She is also Instructor of Oboe and Chairman of the Woodwind Department at The Juilliard School. She also serves on the faculty of Mannes College The New School for Music in New York City, the Bard College Conservatory of Music in Annandale-on-Hudson, NY, the Aspen Music Festival and School, Le Domaine Forget Academie (Quebec), and the Hidden Valley Music Seminars (Carmel, CA).

She was born in Detroit, Michigan. Her primary studies were with John Mack at the Cleveland Institute of Music and at the Interlochen Arts Academy with Don Th. Jaeger, Jay Light, and Robert Morgan. Prior to joining the Met, she was Principal Oboe of the Atlanta Symphony under Robert Shaw.

Her solo recordings are issued by Boston Records, Oboe Classics, and Music Minus One.

External links
Mannes College The New School for Music
The Juilliard School
The Bard College Conservatory of Music
Elaine Douvas Biography

1952 births
Living people
American classical oboists
Cleveland Institute of Music alumni
Juilliard School faculty
Interlochen Center for the Arts alumni
Place of birth missing (living people)
Women oboists
Women music educators